Julia Marcell (born 1982) is a Polish singer-songwriter and pianist.

Career
Marcell was born Julia Górniewicz in Olsztyn, Poland in 1982. Her father, Józef Górniewicz, is a Polish pedagogue and was the dean of the University of Warmia and Mazury in Olsztyn from 2008 to 2012. She wrote songs since she was 14 years old, and circa 2007 she learned how to play the piano. In 2007, she released her first album, the currently out-of-print extended play Storm.

In October 2007, with the help of fans from around the world, she obtained a sum of US$50,000 (through the website Sellaband) to record her first studio album. Titled It Might Like You, it was released in Germany in 2009 and produced by Moses Schneider, who previously worked with bands such as Turbostaat, Beatsteaks, Kreator and Tocotronic.

In 2008, Marcell sang a duet with Cuban American dark cabaret singer Voltaire, named "This Sea". The song appears on his album To the Bottom of the Sea. On the same album, Voltaire makes a cover of her song "Accordion Player". She collaborated with Voltaire once more in 2014, on his album Raised by Bats, on the track "The Devil and Mr. Jones".

On 3 October 2011 she released a second studio album, entitled June, which brought a big change in style and saw Marcell play with rhythm and expand her sound with the addition of electronic instruments. Junes first single, "Matrioszka", was released on 7 August 2011 as a teaser. The music video for "Matrioszka" was released on 27 August 2011. The second single for June, "CTRL", was released on 30 November 2011. The third single, "I Wanna Get on Fire", was released on 20 June 2012, alongside a music video. For June, Marcell was awarded with the prestigious Paszport Polityki prize in 2011, in the "Popular Music" category, and in 2012 she was nominated to seven Fryderyks, winning one of them.

In 2013 she collaborated with theatre director Krzysztof Garbaczewski by providing the music to his adaptations of Marcin Cecko's Kamienne niebo zamiast gwiazd and Witold Gombrowicz's Kronos.

In 2014 she composed the soundtrack of Przemysław Wojcieszek's film Jak całkowicie zniknąć.

Her third studio album, Sentiments, was released on 6 October 2014. On 10 September 2014 she released a music video for one of the tracks that would appear on the album, "Manners".

On 5 January 2016 Marcell announced on her official Facebook page that she began work on her fourth album, Proxy, which was eventually released on 11 March 2016. On the same day she released the promotional single "Andrew" on iTunes.

Marcell currently resides in Berlin, Germany.

Discography

Studio albums

Music videos

References

External links
 

1982 births
Living people
Polish keyboardists
Polish guitarists
Mystic Production artists
Polish pop singers
English-language singers from Poland
21st-century Polish singers
21st-century Polish women singers
21st-century guitarists
21st-century women guitarists